Hajji Abdol (also Romanized as Ḩājjī 'Abdol and Ḩājī 'Abdol; also known as Hāji 'Abdul) is a village in Zu ol Faqr Rural District, Sarshiv District, Saqqez County, Kurdistan Province, Iran. At the 2006 census, its population was 362, in 66 families. The village is populated by Kurds.

References 

Towns and villages in Saqqez County
Kurdish settlements in Kurdistan Province